Kenneth James "Kenny" Hope (6 July 1941 – 14 December 2021) was a football referee from Scotland. He officiated the 1988 Summer Olympics in Seoul. He is referenced in Willie Miller's autobiography, The Don, as being the best referee who ever lived. Hope died in December 2021.

References

1941 births
2021 deaths
Scottish football referees
Scottish Football League referees
Olympic football referees